Mazen Al Suwailem (born 7 April 1996) is a Saudi Arabian professional footballer who plays as a winger for Al-Sahel.

Career

Al-Hilal
Al Suwailem started his career at Al-Hilal and is a product of the Al-Hilal's youth system.

Al-Fateh
On Season 2016-2017 left Al-Hilal and signed with Al-Fateh. On 10 October 2017, Al Suwailem made his professional debut for Al-Fateh against Al-Taawoun in the Pro League, replacing Ali Al-Zaqaan .

Najran
On 8 September 2018, left Al-Fateh and signed with Najran.

Al-Washm
On 6 August 2019, left Najran and signed with Al-Washm.

Al-Sahel
On 3 August 2021, Al-Suwailem joined Al-Sahel.

Career statistics

Club

References

External links

1996 births
Living people
Saudi Arabian footballers
Al Hilal SFC players
Al-Fateh SC players
Najran SC players
Al-Washm Club players
Al-Sahel SC (Saudi Arabia) players
Saudi Professional League players
Saudi First Division League players
Saudi Second Division players
Association football wingers